Pola de Laviana is one of nine parishes (administrative divisions) in Laviana, a municipality within the province and autonomous community of Asturias, in northern Spain. This parish is the most  populated of Laviana and it is located in Nalon Valley.

Moreover, Pola de Laviana is the capital of the Laviana municipality.

The extension of this parish is 9.8 km2 and its population is 9,106 inhabitants (2011).

The Parish 
Pola de Laviana is especially known for its gastronomy. It celebrates the annual religious celebrations of the Virgin of the Otero, the celebrations of the neighborhood of the Pontona, the celebrations on the occasion of the Descent Folkloric of the Nalón, declared of Regional Tourist Interest, the festivities of the Xeronda and The Chalana. Pola de Laviana, as capital, has several administrative, educational, sports and cultural services.

Art 
 Parish Church of Our Mistress of the Assumption whose style is neo-Gothic historical.
Church of Our Mistress of Otero. This church is a work after the fifteenth century. It has a Latin cross shape with a bell gable in a cross shape. This church is dedicated to the patron saint of La Pola.
Chapel of San José. Rebuilt in the historic style of the popular type with ornaments of mountain taste.

Other notable buildings are the Consistorial House, the Ancient Maxi Theater and the traditional buildings of the historical center.

Villages

Sports 
Pola de Laviana has its own soccer team, it's Real Titánico.

References 

Parishes in Laviana